Syricoris tiedemanniana is a moth of the family Tortricidae. It was described by Zeller in 1845. It is found in Scandinavia, the Baltic region, the Netherlands, Germany, Denmark, Austria, Poland and Russia.

The wingspan is 15–17 mm. Adults have been recorded on wing from June to August.

The larvae feed on Equisetum species, including Equisetum palustre.

References

Moths described in 1845
Olethreutini
Moths of Europe